Christchurch City Holdings Ltd (CCHL) is a wholly owned investment arm of the Christchurch City Council. The council controlled trading organisations (CCTO) own and run some of the important infrastructure in Christchurch, such as the public transport and electricity delivery in the city.

Organisations owned by CCHL 
CCHL owns or part-owns the following eight companies.

Lyttelton Port Company 
The Lyttelton Port Company is the management of the main port in the South Island at Lyttelton, New Zealand. It services the city's businesses as the seaport. By June 2012, CCHL ownership had increased to 79.3%.

Christchurch International Airport 

Christchurch International Airport. 75% owned by CCHL.

City Care 
City Care is the City Council's infrastructure management company. They have branches throughout New Zealand and service many councils and businesses. 100% owned by CCHL. After the collapse of construction company Mainzeal, City Care hired their management team. A decision whether City Care will venture into 'vertical construction' has not yet been made. In November 2015, Christchurch City Council decided to sell City Care. After a sales process left only one offer on the table that was considered insufficient, the city council decided in August 2016 that it would keep City Care. Asset sales is one of the top issues in the 2016 Christchurch mayoral election.

Orion 

Orion is an electricity distribution company, that owns and operates the network in the central Canterbury area. It covers the area between the Waimakariri and Rakaia rivers and from the Canterbury Coast to Arthur's Pass. 89.3% owned by CCHL.

Selwyn Plantation Board 
Selwyn Plantation Board operates in forestry and farming. 39.32% owned by CCHL, but the company is in the process of being wound up (it is selling its assets and the proceeds will be distributed to the two shareholding council holding companies). A final payment to CCHL is expected in 2013.

Enable Networks 

Enable Networks builds and runs a new fibre optic network in Christchurch. Enable Networks was first launched in 2007 with funding from CCHL and a grant from the Ministry of Economic Development. Initially launched as Christchurch City Networks Limited (CCNL), in 2009 the company re-branded as Enable Networks. The company is the Crown's partner for its Ultra-Fast Broadband initiative. 100% owned by CCHL.

Red Bus 

Red Bus is one of the public passenger transport operators in Christchurch. 100% owned by CCHL. On 4 November 2020 it was announced that Red Bus's operations and assets had been sold to Ritchies Transport Holdings Ltd for an undisclosed sum with completion expected in early December.

Ecocentral Ltd
The newest company is Ecocentral Ltd, which operates council's recycling. It is 100% owned by CCHL.

See also
Christchurch
Christchurch City Council

References

External links
Christchurch City Council website
CCHL website
Orion website
City Care website
Christchurch International Airport website
Lyttelton Port Company website
Red Bus website

Companies based in Christchurch
Government-owned companies of New Zealand